William Pendleton  may refer to:

 William N. Pendleton (1809–1883), American teacher, Episcopal priest, and soldier
 William Frederic Pendleton (1845–1927), first Executive Bishop of the General Church of the New Jerusalem
 William W. Pendleton, former Democratic member of the Pennsylvania House of Representatives